Paludinella minima is a species of minute salt marsh snail with an operculum, an aquatic gastropod mollusk or micromollusk in the family Assimineidae. This species is endemic to Japan.

References

Further reading 
 Chiba S., Davison A. & Mori H. (2007) "Endemic Land Snail Fauna (Mollusca) on a Remote Peninsula in the Ogasawara Archipelago, Northwestern Pacific". Pacific Science 61(2): 257–265. .

Molluscs of Japan
Paludinella
Assimineidae
Taxonomy articles created by Polbot